Asura uniformis is a moth of the family Erebidae. It is found in Sri Lanka.

Description
The wingspan is about 24 mm. Hind tibia present two spur pairs. Female is pale brownish fuscous. The vertex of head yellowish and anal tuft is ochreous. Wings semi-hyaline. Forewings have a yellowish tinge.

References

uniformis
Moths described in 1893
Moths of Sri Lanka